Rosalba is a genus of beetles in the family Cerambycidae, containing the following species:

 Rosalba alboapicalis (Breuning, 1940)
 Rosalba alcidionoides Thomson, 1864
 Rosalba amazonica Galileo & Martins, 2013
 Rosalba apiculata (Galileo & Martins, 2006)
 Rosalba approximata (Melzer, 1934)
 Rosalba arawakiana Villiers, 1980
 Rosalba bezarki Santos-Silva & Galileo, 2018
 Rosalba bicolor (Audureau, 2016)
 Rosalba birai Santos-Silva & Galileo, 2018
 Rosalba bucki (Melzer, 1934)
 Rosalba cacapyra Galileo & Martins, 2013
 Rosalba cerdai Tavakilian, 2018
 Rosalba clinei Tavakilian, Santos-Silva & Galileo, 2018
 Rosalba contracta Bezark & Santos-Silva, 2019
 Rosalba cordigera (Aurivillius, 1920)
 Rosalba costaricensis (Melzer, 1934)
 Rosalba crassepunctata Breuning, 1948
 Rosalba dalensi Santos-Silva & Galileo, 2018
 Rosalba digna (Melzer, 1934)
 Rosalba fimbriata (Belon, 1903)
 Rosalba formosa Martins & Galileo, 2008
 Rosalba gaianii Joly, 2018
 Rosalba genieri Audureau, 2016
 Rosalba giesberti Santos-Silva & Galileo, 2018
 Rosalba giuglarisi Santos-Silva & Galileo, 2018
 Rosalba hovorei Touroult, 2007
 Rosalba incrustabilis Galileo & Martins, 2006
 Rosalba indistincta (Breuning, 1940)
 Rosalba inscripta (Bates, 1866)
 Rosalba jolyi Galileo & Martins, 2013
 Rosalba lingafelteri Santos-Silva & Galileo, 2018
 Rosalba maculosa Galileo & Martins, 2013
 Rosalba malleri (Melzer, 1934)
 Rosalba mediovittata Galileo & Martins, 2013
 Rosalba mediovittata Galileo & Martins, 2013
 Rosalba monnei Audureau, 2016
 Rosalba morrisi Santos-Silva & Galileo, 2018
 Rosalba nearnsi Santos-Silva & Galileo, 2018
 Rosalba obliqua (Thomson, 1868)
 Rosalba parva Galileo & Martins, 2013
 Rosalba peruviensis Audureau, 2016
 Rosalba pittieri Joly, 2018
 Rosalba pulchella (Belon, 1903)
 Rosalba recta (Thomson, 1868)
 Rosalba rufobasalis (Breuning, 1940)
 Rosalba schneppi Santos-Silva & Galileo, 2018
 Rosalba senecauxi Tavakilian, Santos-Silva & Galileo, 2018
 Rosalba seraisorum Tavakilian, Santos-Silva & Galileo, 2018
 Rosalba similis Joly, 2018
 Rosalba skelleyi Bezark & Santos-Silva, 2019
 Rosalba skillmani Santos-Silva & Galileo, 2018
 Rosalba smaragdina (Breuning, 1940)
 Rosalba stenodesma Joly, Tavakilian, Santos-Silva & Galileo, 2018
 Rosalba stigmatifera (Thomson, 1868)
 Rosalba strandi (Breuning, 1943)
 Rosalba strandiella (Breuning, 1940)
 Rosalba suiaba Martins & Galileo, 2009
 Rosalba tanimbuca Galileo & Martins, 2013
 Rosalba venusta Bezark & Santos-Silva, 2019
 Rosalba wappesi Santos-Silva & Galileo, 2018

References

 
Apomecynini
Cerambycidae genera